Licania fasciculata is a species of plant in the family Chrysobalanaceae endemic to Panama. It is threatened by habitat loss.

Licania fasciculata grows to a height of 12 m, with leaves between 9 cm and 13.5 cm long and flowers 6–7 mm in length, its densely clustered inflorescences making it very distinct from other species in the genus Licania.

It was first described in 1978 by the botanist Ghillean Prance.

References

External links

Endemic flora of Panama
fasciculata
Endangered plants
Plants described in 1978
Taxonomy articles created by Polbot
Taxobox binomials not recognized by IUCN